JoAnna Falco-Leshin has served as a professor of English and Humanities at Miami Dade College since August 1985.

Education
She received her PhD in higher education administration from the University of Miami in 1988.

Leadership 

Falco-Leshin served as the Wolfson Campus faculty Senate President for seven consecutive years. During her tenure in office she served under the leadership of then campus president Eduardo J. Padrón. She was elected vice president of Miami Dade College's faculty Senate Consortium.  As interim President of the College's Senate's Consortium, she presided over a vote endorsing the faculty's collective bargaining efforts. Falco-Leshin was the first vice president of the United Faculty of Miami Dade College Wolfson Campus. A member of NCTE and the AAUP, she is a strong proponent of academic freedom.

Awards 

Falco-Leshin is the recipient of the National Institute for Staff and Organizational Development's award for Teaching Excellence. She is also the first recipient of the Blockbuster Entertainment Corporation's Endowed Teaching Chair.

References

University of Miami alumni
Living people
American academics of English literature
People from Coral Gables, Florida
Year of birth missing (living people)